Riverside is a city in Platte County, Missouri and is part of the Kansas City metropolitan area within the United States. The population was 2,937 at the 2010 census.

History
Riverside lies on the edge of the Missouri River and was formally incorporated in 1951.

For many years, the town was known for its Riverside Race Track. The Riverside Park Jockey Club operated from 1928 to 1937 and was popularly called “Pendergast Track” after its patron, big city boss Tom Pendergast (although Pendergast was not officially on its organization papers). The horse racing track was on the site of a former dog racing track. The track operated under a questionable legal basis. The site was supplanted by an automobile race track, which closed in the 1990s.

A legal gambling establishment on the river now is the $106 million casino run by Argosy Gaming Company.

One of the landmarks in Riverside is the Riverside Red X store. It was founded as a gas station in 1948 by Edward Young. Over time, Young expanded the store into selling many different product lines. Young and local business owners Ferd Filger and Dr. Thomas M. Eagle led the incorporation of Riverside in 1951, after both Parkville and Kansas City expressed interest in annexing the area. As of 2015, the store was still owned by the Young family and was well known around the Kansas City area for selling cheap beer, wine, cigarettes and gasoline.

The Renner Village Archeological Site was listed on the National Register of Historic Places in 1969.

Geography
Riverside is located at  (39.174903, -94.622414).

Demographics

2010 census
As of the census of 2010, there were 2,937 people, 1,308 households, and 672 families living in the city. The racial makeup of the city was 78.1% White, 10.5% African American, 1.2% Native American, 3.0% Asian, 0.6% Pacific Islander, 3.5% from other races, and 3.2% from two or more races. Hispanic or Latino of any race were 8.5% of the population.

There were 1,308 households, of which 26.6% had children under the age of 18 living with them, 33.3% were married couples living together, 13.0% had a female householder with no husband present, 5.1% had a male householder with no wife present, and 48.6% were non-families. 39.0% of all households were made up of individuals, and 7.4% had someone living alone who was 65 years of age or older. The average household size was 2.16 and the average family size was 2.91.

The median age in the city was 39.1 years. 21% of residents were under the age of 18; 8.7% were between the ages of 18 and 24; 29.2% were from 25 to 44; 28.6% were from 45 to 64; and 12.6% were 65 years of age or older. The gender makeup of the city was 51.1% male and 48.9% female.

2000 census
At the 2000 census, there were 2,979 people, 1,222 households and 727 families living in the city. The population density was 559.2 per square mile (215.8/km). There were 1,384 housing units at an average density of 259.8 per square mile (100.3/km). The racial makeup of the city was 84.66% White, 6.14% African American, 1.04% Native American, 2.32% Asian, 0.07% Pacific Islander, 3.05% from other races, and 2.72% from two or more races. Hispanic or Latino of any race were 7.08% of the population.

There were 1,222 households, of which 29.5% had children under the age of 18 living with them, 40.1% were married couples living together, 12.8% had a female householder with no husband present, and 40.5% were non-families. 33.2% of all households were made up of individuals, and 5.1% had someone living alone who was 65 years of age or older. The average household size was 2.28 and the average family size was 2.91.

22.3% of the population were under the age of 18, 10.9% from 18 to 24, 32.0% from 25 to 44, 22.7% from 45 to 64, and 12.1% who were 65 years of age or older. The median age was 35 years. For every 100 females, there were 103.2 males. For every 100 females age 18 and over, there were 102.2 males.

The median household income was $34,679 and the median family income was $36,205. Males had a median income of $31,930 versus $23,368 for females. The per capita income for the city was $17,771. About 7.3% of families and 10.3% of the population were below the poverty line, including 12.9% of those under age 18 and 2.4% of those age 65 or over.

Education
Park Hill School District operates Park Hill South High School at Riverside.

Riverside has a public library, a branch of the Mid-Continent Public Library.

References 

Cities in Platte County, Missouri
Missouri populated places on the Missouri River
Cities in Missouri